Mohammad Mahmudullah (born 4 February 1986), also known as Riyad, is a Bangladeshi cricketer and former captain of the Bangladesh national cricket team in T20I. He has played First-class and List A cricket for Dhaka Division and has represented Bangladesh in all forms of the game. An all-rounder, he is a lower or middle-order batsman as well as an off spin bowler. He has almost 10,000 runs and 150+ wickets. He is prominent for his ability to finish a close limited over game. He is the first Bangladeshi to score a World Cup hundred (3 hundreds in ICC events including back to back hundreds against England and New Zealand). Like Sanath Jayasuriya, Kevin Pietersen, Shoaib Malik, Steve Smith and many more, Mahmudullah started his career as a bowler and then converted into a batsman who could bowl handy off-breaks.

Domestic and T20 career

National Cricket League 
In the 2008-2009 Bangladeshi domestic season Mahmudullah finished as the second-highest run-scorer in the competition with 710 runs at an average of 54.61 and was subsequently recalled to the ODI squad to face Zimbabwe in three ODIs and a tri-series with Sri Lanka and Zimbabwe.

Bangladesh Premier League

Chittagong Kings
The Bangladesh Cricket Board founded the six-team Bangladesh Premier League in 2012, a twenty20 tournament to be held in February that year. An auction was held for teams to buy players, and Mahmadullah was bought by the Chittagong Kings for $110,000. He scored 180 runs in 10 innings with 1 fifty, and took 4 wickets.

In the 2013 Bangladesh Premier League, he scored 233 runs in 12 innings, and took 6 wickets with a best figure of 2/6.

Barisal Bulls
In the 2015 Bangladesh Premier League, Mahmudullah top-scored for his team Barisal Bulls scoring 279 runs in 12 innings with 2 fifties. He also took 5 wickets with the ball.

Khulna Titans
Playing for his new team Khulna Titans in the 2016 Bangladesh Premier League, Mahmudullah top-scored for his team again scoring 396 runs in 14 innings with 2 fifties. With the ball, he took 10 wickets with the best figure being 3/6.

In the 2017 Bangladesh Premier League, Mahmudullah scored 312 runs in 12 innings with 2 half-centuries, and was yet again the top-scorer of his team. Besides, he took 6 wickets with the ball.

In the 2019 Bangladesh Premier League, he scored 219 runs in 12 innings with 1 fifty. He also took 9 wickets.

Chattogram Challengers
In November 2019, he was selected to play for the Chattogram Challengers in the 2019–20 Bangladesh Premier League. Mahmudullah scored 201 runs in 7 innings with 1 fifty. With the ball in hand, he took 3 wickets.

Minister Group Dhaka
In the 2021-22 Bangladesh Premier League, Mahmudullah scored 255 runs in 8 innings with 1 half-century playing for the Minister Group Dhaka. He also took 3 wickets with his best being 1/5.

Pakistan Super League

Quetta Gladiators
For the 2017 Pakistan Super League, Mahmudullah was contracted by Quetta Gladiators. He scored 37 runs in 3 innings. With the ball, he took 7 wickets with his best figure of 3/21.

In the 2018 Pakistan Super League, Mahmudullah scored 34 runs in 2 innings. He also took 1 wicket.

Multan Sultans
In April 2021, he was signed by Multan Sultans to play in the rescheduled matches in the 2021 Pakistan Super League. However he did not feature in any of the matches.

Dhaka Premier Division Cricket League 
In 2017-18 Dhaka Premier Division Cricket League, Mahmudullah was the first pick in the player by choice draft for the Dhaka Premier League acquired by Sheikh Jamal Dhanmondi Club and becoming the highest-paid cricketer.

Bangabandhu T20 Cup 
He played for Gemcon Khulna in 2020-21 Bangabandhu T20 Cup. Mahmudullah as the captain of Gemcon Khulna had won the first edition of Bangabandhu T20 Cup.

Bangladesh Primer League (BPL)

Mahmudullah Riyad will play for Dhaka in the 8th addition of bpl.

International career

Debut years
Mahmudullah was called up for Bangladesh's ODI squad for the three-match series against Sri Lanka in Bangladesh's tour of the country in July 2007. He made his debut on the tour, in the third ODI, where he was Bangladesh's second highest scorer (with 36) and also took 2 wickets, in a match Sri Lanka won by 39 runs.

He went on to be picked for Bangladesh's squads for a Quadrangular Series in Kenya in 2007 and the 2007 Twenty20 World Championship.

Mahmudullah made his Test debut on 9 July 2009 against the West Indies. He performed poorly with the bat, but obtained the best test bowling figures in a match by a Bangladeshi on debut, with an eight-wicket haul, including a five wicket haul in the second innings. This played a major role in Bangladesh's second Test win, and the first on foreign soil.

As permanent member
Although Mahmudullah scored a Test century batting at number 8 against New Zealand, the selection committee preferred not to promote him up the order due to a perceived weakness against fast bowling, despite the number four spot having no permanent occupant. He was included in Bangladesh's 15-man squad for the 2011 ICC Cricket World Cup. On 20 September 2011, Mahmudullah was named Bangladesh's vice-captain, taking over from Tamim Iqbal after the previous captain and deputy were sacked. When West Indies toured in October, Mahmudullah missed all the fixtures with a viral fever. He recovered in time to rejoin the squad to face Pakistan in three ODIs in November. Mahmudullah scored 56 runs and bowled in just one match, taking three wickets from seven deliveries.

2015 World Cup
On 9 March 2015, in the 2015 ICC Cricket World Cup, against England, he scored the first century by a Bangladeshi batsman in World Cup history. Bangladesh went on to win the match and went through to the quarterfinals. In the next match, on 13 March, he scored another World Cup century, this time against New Zealand, although New Zealand won by 3 wickets.

In six matches in the World Cup, he scored 365 runs at an average of 73.00 and eventually became the highest run-getter for Bangladesh in the World Cup.
He was also named in the 'Team of the tournament' by Cricbuzz.

2017 ICC Champions Trophy
Mahmudullah scored a century against New Zealand in a crucial virtual Quarterfinals for the semi-final berth. In that same match he along with Shakib Al Hasan set the record for the highest 5th wicket partnership in ICC Champions Trophy history with 224-run partnership and also the highest partnership for any wicket for Bangladesh.

Captaincy
In January 2018, during the Bangladesh Tri-series final against Sri Lanka, permanent Test captain Shakib injured his left little finger which resulted in bruising and swelling and ruled out from the Test series against Sri Lanka. With that Mahmudullah was named as captain of the Test team. On 31 January 2018, he became the tenth player to lead Bangladesh in Tests. Shakib Al Hasan was also ruled out of the first T20I, with Mahmudullah once again named as captain in his place. Under his captaincy, Bangladesh recorded their highest total in T20Is (193/5), but finally lost the match for Sri Lanka in Tri-nation Series in Bangladesh. In the next match against Sri Lanka in Nidahas Trophy, Bangladesh scored 200 runs for the first time when they chased down 214 to win the game. On 16 March, Mahmudullah scored an unbeaten 43 runs and made Bangladesh qualified for the Nidahas trophy final by hitting a six in the last decisive over to reach the target 160 runs for victory against Sri Lanka in the semi-final match.

In April 2018, he was one of ten cricketers to be awarded a central contract by the Bangladesh Cricket Board (BCB) ahead of the 2018 season. He was named captain in the squad for the home series against West Indies but Shakib al Hasan returned and captained.

2019 Cricket World Cup and beyond
In April 2019, he was named in Bangladesh's squad for the 2019 Cricket World Cup.

For his poor performance in Test cricket, he was suggested by BCB to focus only on limited formats, henceforth in March 2020, when BCB published its new revised contract he was only given White ball contract.

In July 2021, he was added to Bangladesh's test squad for the one-off Test against Zimbabwe, after a gap of 17 months. The match was his 50th test match and he scored an unbeaten 150 runs, his career best in the first innings and making a 191-run partnership with Taskin Ahmed for ninth wicket, highest for Bangladesh, helping Bangladesh to win the test match by 220 runs. Eventually, he announced his retirement from test cricket after this match as well. On 20 July 2021, during the tour of Zimbabwe, Mahmudullah played in his 200th ODI match. In September 2021, Mahmudullah was named as the captain of Bangladesh's squad for the 2021 ICC Men's T20 World Cup.

Retirement
During the third day of the one-off Test match between Bangladesh and Zimbabwe in July 2021, Mahmudullah hinted to his teammates that he was retiring from Test cricket. The news was confirmed when the Bangladeshi players gave him a guard of honour before the start of the fifth day's play. His sudden decision to retire during a match was criticised by the BCB president, who said it would affect the team negatively. The match was his 50th match in Test cricket and he scored an unbeaten 150 runs, his career best, in the first innings, which earned him the Man of the Match award, and Bangladesh won by 220 runs. He officially announced his retirement from Test cricket in November 2021, before the First Test between Bangladesh and Pakistan.

Brand endorsement 
Mahmudullah was signed to Mymensingh Cricket Club by sports agency Imago Sports Management after the 2015 Cricket World Cup. Since 2015, Imago Sports Management has been managing Mahmudullah. HeidelbergCement Bangladesh Limited, a global cement company, has endorsed Mahmudullah for its product Scan Cement. Mahmudullah is the first Bangladeshi centurion in World Cup to sign a contract with HeidelbergCement Bangladesh Limited. Mahmudullah will be featured on Scan Cement billboards, TVC, and other promotional activities. Besides this, Mahmudullah partners with Helio (Mobile Handset Brand) for their social media content and Raw Nation (bat sponsor). As of February 2017, Mahmudullah has endorsement deals with Cheer Up, a beverage brand of PRAN.

USAID's Goodwill Ambassador for youth and development in Bangladesh

Mahmudullah will work with the United States Agency for International Development to engage thousands of young people via social media and public service announcements on the importance of youth empowerment in Bangladesh, and the need to increase education and nutrition, and reduce gender-based violence.

Personal life
On 25 June 2011, Mahmudullah married Jannatul Kawsar Mishti. He has 2 sons, Raeed and Mayed. He is also the brother-in-law of fellow cricketer Mushfiqur Rahim as his (Mahmudullah's) wife's younger sister, Jannatul Kifayet Mondi is married to Mushfiqur. On 8 November, 2020, he tested positive for COVID-19.

Records and achievement

Captaincy record 

 In September 2021, after winning the 2nd T20I match against New Zealand, he became the most successful captain for Bangladesh in T20Is (with 12 wins), surpassing Mashrafe Mortaza.

International record 
 He is the only second cricketer after New Zealand's John Richard Reid, who has achieved the triple of scoring a century, taking five-wicket haul and effecting a stumping in test cricket.

National record 
 Mahmudullah became the first Bangladeshi batsman to score a century in Cricket World Cup,  when he scored a hundred against England in the 2015 Cricket World Cup. He followed it with another century in the 2015 Cricket World Cup with a century against New Zealand Cricket Team
 He is the first Bangladeshi batsman to score two consecutive century in the World Cup. He did so in the 2015 World Cup hitting centuries against England and New Zealand.
 He holds the record of most economical bowling by a Bangladeshi bowler in T20I, conceding only 8 runs in 4 overs against Afghanistan in 2014 ICC World Twenty20.
 In September 2021, He become the first Bangladeshi player to play 100 T20I matches.

See also
 List of Bangladesh cricketers who have taken five-wicket hauls on Test debut

References

External links

 

Mahmudullah Riyad Biodata

1986 births
Living people
Bangladeshi cricketers
Bangladesh Test cricketers
Bangladesh One Day International cricketers
Bangladesh Twenty20 International cricketers
Dhaka Division cricketers
Cricketers at the 2011 Cricket World Cup
Cricketers at the 2015 Cricket World Cup
Cricketers who have taken five wickets on Test debut
Chattogram Challengers cricketers
People from Mymensingh
Asian Games medalists in cricket
Cricketers at the 2014 Asian Games
Asian Games bronze medalists for Bangladesh
Medalists at the 2014 Asian Games
Basnahira Cricket Dundee cricketers
Fortune Barishal cricketers
Prime Bank Cricket Club cricketers
Sheikh Jamal Dhanmondi Club cricketers
Gazi Tank cricketers
Abahani Limited cricketers
Dhaka Metropolis cricketers
Bangladesh Central Zone cricketers
Khulna Tigers cricketers
Quetta Gladiators cricketers
Mymensingh Zilla School alumni
St Kitts and Nevis Patriots cricketers
Bangladesh Test cricket captains